Edusa may refer to:

 Edusa, Chevrolat in Dejean, 1836, the Edusella genus of beetles
 Edusa Gistel, 1848, illegitimate homonym for a genus of tunicates
 Edusa Albers, 1860, illegitimate homonym and synonym of Mesomphix, a genus of gastropods
 Edusa Martens, 1860, illegitimate homonym, a genus of mollusks
 Edusa, also known as Edesia and Edulica, a Roman goddess of nourishment who guarded over children as they learned to eat solid foods

See also